Muhammad Yasir Syamsuddin (born in Medan, North Sumatra, 13 January 1985) is a retired Indonesian footballer.

International career
In 2007, he played to represent the Indonesia U-23, in 2007 SEA Games.

References

Living people
1985 births
Sportspeople from Medan
Indonesian footballers
Liga 1 (Indonesia) players
Arema F.C. players
Persija Jakarta players
Persijap Jepara players
Persiwa Wamena players
Sriwijaya F.C. players
Association football goalkeepers